Velje Polje can mean:
 Velje Polje (Tutin)
 Velje Polje (Višegrad)